Brett Culver Buffington (born May 5, 1961) is a former professional tennis player from the United States.

Biography
Buffington, who was raised in La Jolla, played college tennis for UCLA and was a member of the 1984 NCAA Championship winning team.

For the remainder of the 1980s, Buffington competed on the professional tour, primarily as a doubles player. He made the round of 16 in the mixed doubles at the 1987 Wimbledon Championships, partnering Nicole Jagerman of the Netherlands.

Still based in La Jolla, he now works as a real estate agent.

Challenger titles

Doubles: (1)

References

External links
 
 

1961 births
Living people
American male tennis players
Tennis people from California
UCLA Bruins men's tennis players
People from La Jolla, San Diego